Amit Beilin (born 20 August 2000) is an Israeli footballer who plays as a goalkeeper for American college team Flagler Saints and the Israel women's national team.

Early life
Beilin was raised in Kiryat Gat.

College career
Beilin has attended the Flagler College in the United States.

International career
Beilin has been capped for the Israel national team, appearing for the team during the 2023 FIFA Women's World Cup qualifying cycle.

References

External links
 Amit Beilin – UEFA competition record
 
 
 

2000 births
Living people
People from Kiryat Gat
Israeli women's footballers
Women's association football goalkeepers
Flagler Saints women's soccer players
Israel women's international footballers
Israeli expatriate women's footballers
Israeli expatriate sportspeople in the United States
Expatriate women's soccer players in the United States
Jewish Israeli sportspeople